Ennarea, also known as E(n)narya or In(n)arya (Gonga: Hinnario), was a kingdom in the Gibe region in what is now western Ethiopia. It became independent from the kingdom of Damot in the 14th century and would be the most powerful kingdom in the region until its decline in the 17th century. Being located on the southwestern periphery of the Ethiopian Empire, Ennarea was its tributary throughout much of its history, supplying the emperor with gold and slaves. The culmination of this relationship was the Christianization of the Ennarean elite in the late 1580s. From the late 16th century the kingdom came under increasing pressure by the Oromo, who finally conquered Ennarea in around 1710.

What is known about Ennarea comes mostly from oral traditions as well as a few foreign written sources; it had no indigenous literacy tradition.

History

Early period
According to oral traditions the royal Ennarean clan, the Hinnare Bushasho, originated in northern Ethiopia before settling in the Gibe region. In the 9th century Aksumite king Digna-Jan is said to have led a campaign into Innarya, accompanied by "150 priests carrying 60 consecrated tablets (tabot)".

In the 13th century, Ennarea was recorded to be a province of the Motalami's of Damot, a kingdom south of the Blue Nile. An early 19th-century document regarding the early history of Damot and Ennarea attests a political union of these two kingdoms.

Rise and peak of power
It appears that since the late 14th century (around the same time when Kaffa was founded in the south) Ennarea gained nominal independence from its northern neighbor, although it remained in close contact with it. While Damot was soon annexed by the Ethiopian Empire Ennarea developed to the most important kingdom of the non-Muslim south, replacing Damot as one of the biggest gold and slave mines and degrading Kaffa and Bosa to tributaries. By the reign of Yeshaq I (early 15th century) Ennarea is attested to have been a tributary of the empire, although it seems likely that it had been so already since the campaigns of emperor Amda Seyon 100 years earlier. In a song dedicated to Yeshaq it is stated that Ennarea had to pay a tribute to the empire in the form of gold, slaves and cattle.

Decline, fall and aftermath

Between 1578 and 1586, the Borana Oromo invaded the Gibe region, eventually conquering the territory from around Ennarea to the Blue Nile. During this period of war the Oromo formed a new federation, known as Sadacha. It was the Sadacha who would continue to wage war against Ennarea for the next 130 years. In 1588 the Oromo invaded Ennarea. It was probably this invasion that triggered the Ennarean wish to convert to Christianity. In the same year, emperor Sarsa Dengel pushed south of the Nile, into Ennarea, to bring Christianity. Although Ennarea lost the land between the main Gibe river and Gibe Ennarea due to another Sadacha attack in 1594 it managed to expand north.

In the 17th century, Ennarea declined, as the Oromo weakened its economy by cutting it off from the Ethiopian empire. Eventually, in the mid 17th century, the royal clan of Kaffa seized power in Ennarea. Thus, Kaffa, but also Sheka, became independent from Ennarea. In 1704, an expedition led by emperor Iyasu I reached the kingdom, where he was confronted with a civil war between two throne claimants. It seems that Iyasu's  expedition succeeded in pushing back Kaffa south to the Gojeb river. Six years later, under the rule of Shisafotchi, Ennarea was finally overrun by the Sadacha.

After the fall of the kingdom, Shisafotchi led an exodus south of the Gojeb river, into Kaffa. By the early 19th century this Ennarean exile kingdom had been defeated and vassalized by Kaffa, although its kings remained in nominal office until the Agar Maqnat. Cultural assimilation, slavery, epidemics and political repression made the Ennarean people vanish into history. Meanwhile, the Oromo settled in what once constituted Ennarea, changed their mode of production from pastoralism to agriculture, and, by the early 19th century, founded five kingdoms: Limmu-Ennarea, Jimma, Gera, Gomma and Gumma.

King and council
The kingship of Ennarea was a divine one: the king (Hinnare-tato) dined one time a day, always behind a curtain and with his meal resting on the back and shoulders of a slave. He probably also sat behind a curtain when a visitor came along, communicating with him via an intermediary, the Afe Busho. The kings wore rich golden jewelry, like a bracelet, a crown with a cross on its top as well as a phallic projection on the front (possibly gifted by emperor Sarsa Dengel in 1587) and two pieces representing the two sexes, symbolizing "eternal fertility and prosperity". Non-gold royal insignia consisted of a white-red-black (from left to right) flag, an umbrella and diverse musical instruments. Most kings were provided by the Hinnaro Bushasho clan, although it seemed to have been divided into two groups or lineages: a native one and one that claimed a northern, perhaps Amhara or Tigre origin. The latter were generally regarded as superior to the former. The kings had two residences: one in Yadare and one in Gowi.

The true seat of power in Ennarea did not rest with the king, however, but the council, the Mikretcho. A decision by the Mikretcho was absolute and could not be vetoed by the king. It was also them who decided what prince would become the next king. The council consisted of following title holders: the Bushashe-rasha (probably two brothers of the current king, who spoke for him on council meetings), the Hinnare-katemerasha (royal representative and leader in war), the Awa-rasha (the king's spokesman), the Barta-rasha (probably had a religious function) and the Gutchi-rasha (observer of Ennarea's slave trade). The Atche-rasha (responsible for the royal treasures) is also claimed to have been part of the council, though this is not certain.

Economy

Ennarea was "a rich slave state, completely exploited of its natural and human resources for the benefit of foreign overlords.” The exports of Ennarea focused primarily on slaves and gold. Its gold was already mentioned in the 14th century and was recorded to be of extraordinarily high quality. Evidently, the Ethiopian emperors were quite keen to keep European travellers away from Ennarea, since they feared for their gold monopoly.

Concerning horticulture, the Ennareans, like the other Gonga people, cultivated the ensete, or “false banana plant”. It was not only consumed but also used to make toys and clothes. Beside the ensete all the Gonga people grew various potato species, black yams and teff. Pumpkins are recorded to have been introduced by the Oromo.

Religion

Christianity

It remains unknown when and how Christianity took roots in Ennarea. Christian influence can be assumed since the 9th century, with the priest-accompanied expedition of Digna-Jan. In the later 14th century a Christian missionary was said to have been sent to Ennarea. However, it was only in the early 16th when a Christian community was actually recorded to have thrived inside the kingdom.

During the reign of king La’Ashohni ( 1570–1580), who was recorded to have "loved the Christian religion", a request for baptism was sent to the imperial court, which was, however, rejected, since Christian subjects had to pay considerably less tribute than Pagan ones.
The request was repeated by his son Badancho. This time the emperor accepted the request (though mostly to have a Christian buffer state against the invading Oromo forces). After conversion, Badancho attempted to spread Christianity among his subjects not only by building many churches, but also by offering precious gifts to every single convert. Expectedly, a high number of people converted, but this golden age of Christianity was only for a short period: only some decades later, during the reign of emperor Susenyos, it was recorded that Ennarean Christianity had “very much declined". To counter that fact Susenyos, who was a Catholic, sent a large number of priests to Ennarea. Perhaps it was under him when Catholicism was introduced in the region. King Emana Krestos (r.  1630–1640) was recorded to be a "very good Catholic", but it remains unclear if the succeeding Ennarean monarchs were Catholic or Orthodox. What seems clear, however, is the fact that only the nobility remained Christian in general, with their religion functioning as a kind of elite status, while the common people stuck to Paganism.
Ennarea probably played the role of a filter of Christian influences from the north upon the other Gonga people, especially Kaffa and Seka.

Islam

Islam was probably only of limited relevance in the region before 1710, although Muslims were mentioned to have lived in Ennarea at the time of king Benero.

Kings

Chronology based on Werner Lange's "The History of the Southern Gonga (southwestern Ethiopia)":

Hinnare-tatos of Ennarea

Hinnare-tatos in exile

Notes

References
 
 
 
 
 

Former monarchies of Africa
History of Ethiopia
1710 disestablishments in Africa
Coptic Orthodox Church
Catholicism in Ethiopia
2nd millennium in Ethiopia